Ernst Diehl (born 28 March 1949 in Etschberg) is a retired German football player and coach. As a player, he spent 11 seasons in the Bundesliga with 1. FC Kaiserslautern.

Honors
 DFB-Pokal finalist: 1971–72, 1975–76

References

External links
 

1949 births
Living people
German footballers
Bundesliga players
1. FC Kaiserslautern players
German football managers
1. FC Kaiserslautern managers
Association football defenders